Dolly Mixture were an English twee pop band, formed in 1978 by the bassist and vocalist Debsey Wykes, guitarist and vocalist Rachel Bor, and drummer Hester Smith. They had a taste of top 40 success performing backing vocals for the Captain Sensible hit "Wot", a top 10 hit with Sensible on "Glad It's All Over", and a UK No. 1 hit backing Sensible on his 1982 cover of "Happy Talk". Rachel Bor also featured on the Animus/Loose Records single "Wot NO Meat?" also by Captain Sensible in 1985. Bor and Wykes performed together on 24 April 2013 at the Islington Assembly Hall in London.

Career

Early years
The group was formed in Cambridge, England, by Bor, Smith, and Wykes, three school friends who shared a fondness for the Shangri-Las and the Undertones. Dolly Mixture supported the Undertones on one of their first UK tours. The band also played venues with the Fall and the Transmitters in 1979. They were once supported by U2. In Autumn 1981, they toured as the featured support band for Bad Manners on their Gosh It's tour and were well received by the second wave mod/ska audience that filled various theatres and venues up and down the land.

Relocating to London to gig extensively, national BBC Radio 1 DJ John Peel gave them exposure on his radio show and in his weekly column in the UK pop paper, Sounds. Signed to Chrysalis Records, the group released a cover of the Shirelles hit, "Baby It's You" (1980), produced by Eric Faulkner of the Bay City Rollers. However, the cover version was disowned by the group, which protested the label's attempt to sell them as a teen girl group. Their next single, "Been Teen" (1981), was the first single released on Paul Weller's Respond label. It was followed by "Everything and More" (1982), also released on Respond. Both singles were produced by Captain Sensible and Paul Gray of the Damned. They became friends with Sensible and recorded backing vocals on his singles and albums. After Sensible had a hit with "Happy Talk" in 1982 (featuring Dolly Mixture, credited as "Dolly Mixtures" on the single, and also in the song's video) and following various appearances on the television show Top of the Pops, Dolly Mixture – as a separate entity from Captain Sensible – performed extensively.

Dolly's "Demonstration Tapes"
In 1983, the band released a double album called the Demonstration Tapes on their own Dead Good Dolly Platters label. The album sported a plain white cover and each copy was numbered and autographed by the group members. One thousand copies were pressed. The album featured 27 demo tracks which covered a large part of the band's repertoire.

The same year saw a release of the "Remember This" single, again on Dead Good Dolly Platters label. The B-side was a piece entitled "Listening Pleasure/Borinda's Lament", which included dialogue (à la Home Service British Force's Radio DJ), a half-finished song and an instrumental chamber piece with Wykes on piano and Bor on cello.

Fireside EP and the end of Dolly Mixture
The 12-inch vinyl Fireside EP was released in 1984 on Cordelia Records, owned by Alan Jenkins, a member of the Deep Freeze Mice. The six-track EP represented the band's new artistic direction and contained mostly instrumental pieces, abandoning the guitar/bass/drum format with piano and strings. The most recognisable track was "Dolly Medley", containing highlights of the Dolly's repertoire, including the previously unreleased "Dead Rainbow", all done in a chamber music style. It was produced by Dolly Mixture and Andrew Fryer.

The trio dissolved as a working band in 1984.

Reunions
Bor and Wykes performed together on 24 April 2013 at the Islington Assembly Hall in London.

Re-issues
In 1995, Saint Etienne member Bob Stanley re-released the Demonstration Tapes album on his short-lived Royal Mint label.

In 1998, Japanese Musician Cornelius released the "Dreamism!" single in Japan on his Trattoria label. The single collected one previously unreleased song ("My Rainbow Valley") plus three alternate versions of previously released songs.

In 2010, Dolly Mixture release a three CD box set including the Demonstration Tapes album, all of the band's singles plus a complete disc of additional demos and live recordings, many of which are available for the first time. The box set will be limited edition only and features 56 re-mastered recordings and a 32-page booklet.

A vinyl double-LP was reissued by London-based label Germs of Youth to coincide with the box set. It is an exact copy of the 1984 release (limited to 300 copies), hand stamped with the original stamp and signed/numbered by the band.

in 2019, the LP Other Music was released by Sealed Records, a sublabel of La Vida Es Un Mus.  It was a compilation of alternate versions and other recordings by the band, released as limited vinyl and streaming.

Other projects
Wykes and Smith resurfaced with the group Coming Up Roses, which featured more melodic dance-pop. With Wykes and Smith, the early line-up comprised ex-Shillelagh Sisters member Patricia O'Flynn (saxophone), Leigh Luscious (guitar), and ex-Amazulu member Claire Kenny (bass). The latter three members were replaced by Jane Keay, Tony Watts, and Midus respectively. In 1989, Coming Up Roses released a six-track mini-album, I Said Ballroom, on Utility Records. All songs were written by Wykes and Smith. The first Coming Up Roses gig was at The White Swan in Brixton on 29 November (as part of the Send a Volunteer to Nicaragua benefit), and the last performance was at Up the Creek in Greenwich. 

Meanwhile, Wykes started collaborating with Saint Etienne as one of the band's regular backing singers; she has continued in this role, appearing with the band on its tour for the 2017 album Home Counties. Saint Etienne's Bob Stanley became the new Dolly Mixture champion, re-releasing their untitled 1983 double album (this time titled Demonstration Tapes) as a single CD on the Royal Mint label in 1995. Together with Saint Etienne's Paul Kelly, Wykes went on to form indie-chamber-pop band Birdie, which released the albums Some Dusty (1999), Triple Echo (2001) and Reverb Deluxe (2003).

Rachel Bor played in a band called Fruit Machine until 1999.

Discography

References

External links
2013 reunion

All-female punk bands
English pop music groups
English pop punk groups
English post-punk music groups
British musical trios
Musical groups established in 1978
Musical groups disestablished in 1984
Musical groups from Cambridge
Chrysalis Records artists